Aaj Shahzeb Khanzada Kay Sath (previously Aaj Kamran Khan Kay Sath) is a Pakistani television evening current affairs talk show broadcasting on Geo News every Monday to Friday. The show is hosted by Shahzeb Khanzada. Previously, it was hosted by investigative journalist Kamran Khan, directed by Junaid Mumtaz and produced by Asmat Mallick. Shahzaib Khanzada is a Former anchorperson of Express TV.
Shahzaib Khanzada received best Anchor person Award for 2013, in the ceremony organized by Pakistan media Award.

History
Aaj Kamran Khan Ke Saath discuss the major stories  of the day with his expert analysis on the matter and often add up the views of famous journalists, anchors and political figures of Pakistan. Within one hour, Aaj Kamran Khan Ke Saath updates the viewers with daily current affairs and facts behind the concerning matters. Geo TV broadcast Aaj Kamran Khan Ke Saath with Anchor Kamran Khan from Monday to Thursday. However, this show was initially known as Kamran Khan Show and which was broadcast on Geo News. Kamran Khan has left GEO news. On 24 July 2014, Geo news broadcast the last episode of Aaj Kamran Khan Ke Sath. and the show has now been replaced with Aaj Shahzeb Khanzada Kay Sath.

References

External links 

Official website
Shahzeb Khanzada's official news website

Geo TV original programming
Pakistani television talk shows